Kevin Josué López Maldonado (born 3 February 1996) is a Honduran professional footballer who plays as a midfielder for Olimpia and the Honduras national team.

Career 
López made his professional debut with Motagua in a 2–1 Liga Nacional win over Parrillas One on 13 April 2014, scoring the game winner in the 88th minute.

International career
López made his senior debut with the Honduras national team in a 4–0 friendly win over Puerto Rico on 6 September 2019.

Scores and results list Honduras' goal tally first.

Honours
Comunicaciones 
Liga Nacional de Guatemala: Clausura 2022

References

External links
 

1996 births
Living people
People from Cortés Department
Honduran footballers
Honduras international footballers
Honduras youth international footballers
Association football midfielders
F.C. Motagua players
Liga Nacional de Fútbol Profesional de Honduras players